Sabetai Unguru (Shabtai Unguru; born 1 January 1931) is an Israeli historian of mathematics and science.

Biography
Sabetai Unguru was born in 1931 in Podu Iloaiei, Romania. He studied philosophy, philology, history, and mathematics at the University of Iași, before immigrating to Israel in 1961. He obtained his Ph.D. in the history of science from the University of Wisconsin–Madison in 1970, and was an assistant and associate professor in the
Department of History at the University of Oklahoma between 1970 and 1982.

Unguru was appointed associate professor at Tel Aviv University in 1983, and became full professor in 1987. He served as Director of the Cohn Institute for the History and Philosophy of Science and Ideas at Tel Aviv University from 1991 to 1997.

Selected works

Books

Articles

See also

References

1931 births
People from Iași County
Alexandru Ioan Cuza University alumni
Historians of mathematics
Historians of science
Institute for Advanced Study visiting scholars
Israeli historians
Romanian emigrants to Israel
Living people
Academic staff of Tel Aviv University
University of Oklahoma faculty
University of Wisconsin–Madison alumni